Socialist List of Tårnby (in Danish: Tårnby Socialistiske Liste) is a political alliance in Tårnby, Denmark. In 2005 it contested the municipal elections for the fourth time. It got 199 votes (1%), far below the 600 votes (2.1%) it had got in 2001. In 2001 the list included members of Red-Green Alliance, Communist Party in Denmark, Communist Party of Denmark and Workers Party Common Course, as well as independents. By 2005 The Red-Green Alliance launched a list of their own, and the Communist Party in Denmark was the sole organized force remaining in the Socialist List.

The list did not win any seat in 2005.

External links
Article about the 2001 elections

Political party alliances in Europe
Socialist parties in Denmark
Tårnby Municipality
Political parties with year of establishment missing